Josh Bootsma (born 22 February 1993) is an Australian rules footballer currently listed with  in the West Australian Football League (WAFL). He previously played for the Carlton Football Club in the Australian Football League (AFL), but had his contract terminated midway through the 2014 season, for breaching the club's and the AFL's codes of conduct.

Background and junior career
Bootsma was born in 1993 into a football-oriented family, with his father Brad having played 163 WAFL matches for South Fremantle and 23 AFL matches for Fremantle in the 1990s and 2000s.

In 2011, Bootsma started the year playing for his local club North Albany, before joining WAFL side South Fremantle mid season. He went on to play 13 colts games for South Fremantle, including the premiership. Bootsma's 13 games for the Bulldogs saw his 2011 AFL Draft prospects rise greatly, with him being touted by Kevin Sheehan as a potential top 30 pick. After attracting the attention of several AFL clubs, Bootsma was drafted by the Carlton Football Club with its first round selection in the 2011 AFL National Draft (No. 22 overall). At the time he was drafted, Bootsma was in the process of completing an apprenticeship as an electrician. He was given guernsey number 21.

AFL career
After starting the 2012 season playing for the Northern Blues in the Victorian Football League, Bootsma made his AFL debut in Round 6 against , as a late replacement.

References

External links

WAFL playing statistics

Australian rules footballers from Western Australia
1993 births
Living people
North Albany Football Club players
Peel Thunder Football Club players
Preston Football Club (VFA) players
Carlton Football Club players
People from Albany, Western Australia
Australian people of Dutch descent